There several railway stations known as Liverpool Road:

 Chester Liverpool Road railway station
 Liverpool Road railway station (Manchester)
 Liverpool Road Halt railway station (Newcastle-under-Lyme)
 Kidsgrove Liverpool Road railway station
 Liverpool Street station, London